Edwin K. Steers (January 19, 1915 – November 30, 1992) was an American politician who served as the Attorney General of Indiana from 1953 to 1965. He also served as a U.S. prosecutor at the Nuremberg trials and the Belsen trial following the Second World War.

Biography
Steers graduated from the Indiana University Maurer School of Law in Bloomington. He was admitted to the bar in 1937.

In 1943, Steers joined the United States Navy and served in the Second World War and the Korean War. After V.E. Day, Steers was a naval representative to the State Department's War Crimes office and became involved with the prosecution of Nazi war criminals. He served as a U.S. special prosecutor at the Nuremberg trials and at the Belsen trial in Lüneburg.

Steers served as deputy prosecutor of Marion County from 1947 to 1948. Steers served as Indiana Attorney General from 1953 to 1965 in the administrations of Governors George N. Craig, Harold W. Handley, and Matthew E. Welsh. He lost his re-election bid in 1964 to Democrat John J. Dillon.

Steers was a Shriner, and in 1956 he served as potentate of the Murat Shrine Temple in Indianapolis. Steers was also a Scottish Rite Freemason and a member of the Beta Theta Pi and Phi Delta Phi fraternities.

References

1915 births
1992 deaths
Indiana Attorneys General
Indiana Republicans
People from Indianapolis
American prosecutors
American Freemasons
20th-century American naval officers